The bridled frog (Litoria nigrofrenata) is a species of frog in the subfamily Pelodryadinae. It is found in Australia and New Guinea. Its natural habitats are subtropical or tropical dry forests, moist savanna, intermittent rivers, swamps, intermittent freshwater marshes, and ponds. It is threatened by habitat loss.

References

Litoria
Amphibians of Queensland
Amphibians described in 1867
Taxa named by Albert Günther
Taxonomy articles created by Polbot
Frogs of Australia